Madera Unified School District is a public school district serving Madera, California.

History
The district was first incorporated in 1966 to consolidate the administration of schools in and around the City of Madera. The district has 28 schools (14 K-6 elementary schools, 4 K-8 country schools, 3 middle schools, 2 high schools, 2 alternative education centers, one adult school, and a preschool program). In recent years, M.U.S.D has added 7 new schools (4 elementary schools and 1 middle school) and completed two high schools: Madera South High School (formerly named Madera High School - South Campus) and Matilda Torres High School.

Voting Rights Act lawsuit 
Madera Unified's capitulation when faced with a 2008 lawsuit about the manner in which school board trustees were elected, as well as a judge's related ruling on the matter, has reportedly influenced other California school districts and other governmental bodies to change from at-large representation, which dominates the state's school districts, to a by-district system. Four Madera plaintiffs, represented by San Francisco-based Lawyers' Committee for Civil Rights, alleged that the at-large voting system resulted in racial polarization that resulted in the city's Latino majority of 82 percent being politically marginalized, which they said violated the state's 2002 Voting Rights Act. That statistic is slightly misleading, however, as only 44 percent of those eligible to vote in an MUSD election were Latinos, according to a press release by Anayma DeFrias of the aforementioned LCCR. The Madera case was one of the first to be filed under the California Voting Rights Act. The school district settled out of court without admitting guilt but agreeing to change how school board trustees were elected, according to The Madera Tribune daily newspaper in 2008.

Recent superintendents 
The Madera Unified School Board placed Superintendent John Stafford on leave with pay for the remainder of the 2010-11 school year.  No reason was given.  After a short search a new superintendent, Gustavo Balderas, was hired in 2011 on a three-year contract.  Balderas surprised the district by resigning to take another superintendent position in Southern California in 2012.  During the search for a replacement for Balderas accusations were made of improper conduct by several board members in regards to the search, and that search was aborted and an investigation launched.  In the meantime the board rehired former superintendent Julie O'Kane as interim.  In July 2013 it was announced that Ed Gonzales, former teacher and principal in Madera Unified, was hired as superintendent.

Schools

Elementary schools
John Adams Elementary School
Alpha Elementary School
Berenda Elementary School
Caesar E. Chavez Elementary School
Eastin-Arcola Elementary School
Lincoln Elementary School
James Madison Elementary School
Millview Elementary School
James Monroe Elementary School
Nishimoto Elementary School
Parkwood Elementary School
John J. Pershing Elementary School
Sierra Vista Elementary School
George Washington Elementary School
Virginia Lee Rose Elementary School

Middle schools
Jack G. Desmond Middle School
Martin Luther King Jr, Middle School
Thomas Jefferson Middle School

High schools
Madera High School
Madera South High School
Matilda Torres High School

K-8 schools
Dixieland School
Howard School
La Vina School
Eastin Arcola

Alternative education
Furman High School 
Adult Education

References

External links
 

School districts in Madera County, California
School districts established in 1966
1966 establishments in California